Kari Myyryläinen (born 22 October 1963) is a Finnish former professional racing cyclist. He won the Finnish national road race title in 1983, 1985 and 1986. He also competed at the 1984 and 1996 Summer Olympics.

Major results

1980
 1st  Road race, National Junior Road Championships
1981
 National Junior Road Championships
1st  Road race
1st  Time trial
1983
 National Road Championships
1st  Road race
1st  Time trial
 2nd Overall Tour de Berlin
1984
 1st  Time trial, National Road Championships
1985
 National Road Championships
1st  Road race
1st  Time trial
 1st Grand Prix de France
 7th Overall Tour of Norway
1986
 1st  Road race, National Road Championships
 1st 
 2nd Overall Tour de Berlin
 2nd Scandinavian Open Road Race
1987
 1st Stage 2 Vuelta a Burgos
 1st Stage 5 Tour de l'Avenir
1990
 7th Overall Tour of Norway
1st Stages 1 & 3
1991
 1st Stage 4 Cinturón a Mallorca
1993
 1st  Time trial, National Road Championships
1994
 8th Overall Tour of Sweden
1996
 3rd Road race, National Road Championships

References

External links
 

1963 births
Living people
Finnish male cyclists
People from Hyvinkää
Olympic cyclists of Finland
Cyclists at the 1984 Summer Olympics
Cyclists at the 1996 Summer Olympics
Sportspeople from Uusimaa